Juozas Balčikonis (24 March 1885 in Ėriškiai, Panevėžys District – 5 February 1969 in Vilnius) was a Lithuanian linguist and teacher, who contributed to the standardization of the Lithuanian language.

References 

1885 births
1969 deaths
20th-century linguists
20th-century Lithuanian educators
People from Panevėžys County
Linguists from Lithuania
Lithuanian lexicographers
20th-century lexicographers
Recipients of the Order of the Red Banner of Labour
Lithuanian schoolteachers